1934 in philosophy

Events

Publications 
 John Dewey, Art as Experience (1934)
 Karl Popper, The Logic of Scientific Discovery (1934)

Births 
 January 17 - Fabien Eboussi Boulaga, Cameroonian philosopher (died 2018)
 March 25 - Gloria Steinem 
 April 13 - György Márkus (died 2016)
 April 14 - Fredric Jameson 
 August 5 - Wendell Berry 
 December 26 - Richard Swinburne

Deaths

References 

Philosophy
20th-century philosophy
Philosophy by year